The Asian thrushes are medium-sized mostly insectivorous or omnivorous birds in the genus Zoothera of the thrush family, Turdidae. The genus name Zoothera comes from the Ancient Greek zoon, "animal" and theras, "hunter".

Two New World species traditionally regarded as Zoothera (varied thrush and Aztec thrush) actually belong elsewhere in the thrush family. A group containing Siberian thrush and the African species is not closely related to the other Zoothera and are now assigned to the genus Geokichla.

Species in taxonomic order
The following species are recognised in the genus Zoothera

Long-tailed thrush (Zoothera dixoni)
Alpine thrush (Zoothera mollissima)
Himalayan thrush (Zoothera salimalii)
Sichuan thrush (Zoothera griseiceps)
Long-billed thrush (Zoothera monticola)
Geomalia (Zoothera heinrichi)
Dark-sided thrush (Zoothera marginata)
Everett's thrush (Zoothera everetti)
Sunda thrush (Zoothera andromedae)
White's thrush (Zoothera aurea)
Scaly thrush (Zoothera dauma)
Nilgiri thrush (Zoothera neilgherriensis)
Sri Lanka thrush (Zoothera imbricata)
Amami thrush (Zoothera major)
†Bonin thrush (Zoothera terrestris) - extinct (c. 1830s)
Guadalcanal thrush (Zoothera turipavae)
Makira thrush (Zoothera margaretae)
Russet-tailed thrush (Zoothera heinei)
Fawn-breasted thrush (Zoothera machiki)
Bassian thrush (Zoothera lunulata)
Black-backed thrush (Zoothera talaseae)

Traditional Zoothera species belonging elsewhere in family
Varied thrush (Ixoreus naevius) - related to other new world genera
Aztec thrush (Ridgwayia pinicola) - related to Hylocichla

Geokichla thrushes 
 Siberian thrush, Geokichla sibirica
Pied thrush, Geokichla wardii
Grey ground thrush, Geokichla princei
Black-eared ground thrush, Geokichla cameronensis
 Spotted ground thrush, Geokichla guttata - formerly G. fischeri
Spot-winged thrush, Geokichla spiloptera
Crossley's ground thrush, Geokichla crossleyi
Abyssinian ground thrush, Geokichla piaggiae
 Kivu ground thrush, Geokichla piaggiae tanganjicae
Oberländer's ground thrush, Geokichla oberlaenderi
Orange ground thrush, Geokichla gurneyi
Orange-headed thrush, Geokichla citrina
Buru thrush, Geokichla dumasi
 Seram thrush, Geokichla joiceyi
Orange-sided thrush, Geokichla peronii
Slaty-backed thrush, Geokichla schistacea
 Chestnut-capped thrush, Geokichla interpres
 Enggano thrush, Geokichla leucolaema
Chestnut-backed thrush, Geokichla dohertyi
 Ashy thrush, Geokichla cinerea
Red-backed thrush, Geokichla erythronota
 Red-and-black thrush, Geokichla mendeni

References

Further reading
Klicka, J., G. Voelker, and G.M. Spellman. 2005.A molecular phylogenetic analysis of the ‘‘true thrushes’’ (Aves: Turdinae). Molecular Phylogenetics and Evolution 34: 486–500.
Sangster, G., J.M. Collinson, P.-A. Crochet, A.G. Knox, D.T. Parkin, L. Svensson, and S.C. Votier. 2011. Taxonomic recommendations for British birds: seventh report. Ibis 153: 883–892.
Voelker, G., and J. Klicka. 2008. Systematics of Zoothera thrushes, and a synthesis of true thrush molecular systematic relationships. Molecular Phylogenetics and Evolution 49: 377–381.
Voelke, G., and R.K. Outlaw. 2008. Establishing a perimeter position: speciation around the Indian Ocean Basin. Journal of Evolutionary Biology 21: 1779–1788.

External links

Asian thrush videos on the Internet Bird Collection

 
Birds of Asia
Taxa named by Nicholas Aylward Vigors